Carlos Antônio Ribeiro de Oliveira or simply Carlos Antônio (born April 3, 1990 in Apiacá), is a Brazilian striker. He currently plays for Olaria.

On January 24, 2009, Carlos Antônio played his first match for Vasco, when his club beat Americano 0-2 for the Campeonato Carioca.

External links
 netvasco.com.br 

1990 births
Living people
Brazilian footballers
CR Vasco da Gama players
Sportspeople from Espírito Santo
Association football defenders